The Song of the Riverside (Spanish: La canción de la ribera) is a 1936 Argentine film directed by Julio Irigoyen.

Cast
 Olinda Bozán 
 Ada Cornaro 
 Totón Podestá

References

Bibliography 
 Roberto Blanco Pazos & Raúl Clemente. Diccionario de actrices del cine argentino, 1933-1997. Corregidor, 1997.

External links 
 

1936 films
1930s Spanish-language films
Films directed by Julio Irigoyen
Argentine black-and-white films
1930s Argentine films